Aarion Shawnae McDonald (born August 20, 1998) is an American basketball player for the Atlanta Dream of the Women's National Basketball Association (WNBA). She was drafted third overall by the Dream in the 2021 WNBA draft after playing college basketball at the University of Washington and the University of Arizona.

Early life and high school 
McDonald grew up in Fresno, California as the youngest of six children. After initially playing at Bullard High School in her freshman year, she transferred to Brookside Christian High School in Stockton, California. At Brookside, she compiled nearly 1,500 points scored in her two years with the school, recording multiple triple-doubles and even a quadruple double. A four-star recruit, she committed to playing college basketball at Washington.

College career

University of Washington 
After missing the first seven games due to injury, McDonald played in 28 games, starting 21 of them. She was named to the Pac-12 All-Freshman team after averaging 9.8 points on the season, third on the team behind Kelsey Plum and Chantel Osahor.

McDonald announced that she would leave the program and transfer after one season. She cited departures of Plum, Osahor, head coach Mike Neighbors, assistant coach Morgan Valley, and the passing of her grandfather as reasons for her transfer.

University of Arizona 
McDonald decided to transfer to play at Arizona for Adia Barnes, a former Washington assistant who was heavily involved in recruiting her to play for the Huskies. She spent her first season with the program sitting out due to transfer rules and was a member of the scout team.

Redshirt sophomore year 
McDonald made an immediate impact in her first year on the court for the Wildcats, tying the school's single game scoring record with 39 points against Loyola Marymount in the second game of the season. She finished the season with 890 points scored, breaking a single-season record set by her coach Barnes, and was the second player in Pac-12 history to have 800 points and 150 assists, joining her former teammate Plum. She was named to the All-Pac-12 first team and defensive team at the end of the season.

Redshirt junior year 
After tying the single-game record for scoring in the previous season, McDonald broke the record with a 44-point performance against 22nd-ranked Texas on November 17, 2019.

McDonald racked up awards, being named a second-team All-American by the Associated Press and United States Basketball Writers Association, a first-team All-American by the Women's Basketball Coaches Association, Pac-12 Defensive Player of the Year, first-team All-Pac-12 and on the Pac-12 All-Defensive team. She was also a finalist for the Naismith Defensive Player of the Year Award and named the 2020 recipient of the Ann Meyers Drysdale Award, given to the top shooting guard in the country.

Although she was eligible for the WNBA draft, McDonald announced that she would return for her senior season at Arizona.

Redshirt senior year 
McDonald was named the Pac-12 Conference Player of the Year, becoming the first Arizona player to win the award since her head coach Adia Barnes. She was also named the Co-Defensive Player of the Year, the second consecutive year she was named the winner.

McDonald excelled during Arizona's 2021 NCAA tournament run. After leading the Wildcats past Stony Brook and BYU, she scored 31 points against Texas A&M in the Sweet Sixteen, sending Arizona to the Elite Eight for the first time. She scored 33 points in the Wildcats' Elite Eight match against Indiana, despite suffering an ankle injury with more than two minutes remaining in the game. In their next game against UConn, she scored 26 points en route to earning the first championship appearance in program history, as well as praise from UConn head coach Geno Auriemma.

In the national championship game, McDonald scored a game-high 22 points and was able to get the final shot of the game off, but could not get it to fall as the Wildcats lost to Stanford 54–53, ending their historic run. She ended her college career after scoring double-digits in 93 consecutive games, which was the longest active streak.

Professional career 
After her stellar performance in the NCAA tournament, McDonald was projected to be drafted in the top five of the upcoming WNBA draft by multiple media outlets. She ended up being drafted third overall by the Atlanta Dream in the 2021 WNBA draft.

WNBA career statistics

Regular season

|-
| style="text-align:left;"| 2021
| style="text-align:left;"| Atlanta
| 30 || 4 || 16.4 || .322 || .308 || .882 || 1.6 || 2.0 || 0.8 || 0.2 || 1.2 || 6.3
|-
| style="text-align:left;"| 2022
| style="text-align:left;"| Atlanta
| 36 || 6 || 24.3 || .411 || .338 || .871 || 2.3 || 2.6 || 1.4 || 0.0 || 2.1 || 11.1
|-
| style="text-align:left;"| Career
| style="text-align:left;"| 2 years, 1 team
| 66 || 10 || 20.7 || .379 || .325 || .875 || 2.0 || 2.3 || 1.2 || 0.1 || 1.7 || 8.9

College statistics

College 

|-
| style="text-align:left;" | 2016–17
| style="text-align:left;" | Washington
| 28 || 21 || 24.1 || .473 || .330 || .667 || 2.7 || 1.4 || 1.4 || 0.1 || 1.6 || 9.8
|- 
| style="text-align:left;" | 2017–18
| style="text-align:left;" | Arizona
| style="text-align:center;" colspan=12 | Sat out due to NCAA transfer rules
|-
| style="text-align:left;" | 2018–19
| style="text-align:left;" | Arizona
| 37 || 37 || 35.7 || .452 || .281 || .755 || 6.5 || 4.6 || 2.6 || 0.1 || 3.8 || 24.1
|-
| style="text-align:left;" | 2019–20
| style="text-align:left;" | Arizona
| 29 || 29 || 31.8 || .458 || .278 || .788 || 5.6 || 3.6 || 2.3 || 0.0 || 3.8 || 20.6
|-
| style="text-align:left;" | 2020–21
| style="text-align:left;" | Arizona
| 27 || 27 || 33.6 || .407 || .345 || .765 || 5.4 || 4.0 || 2.6 || 0.1 || 3.1 || 20.6
|-
| style="text-align:center;" | Career
| 5 years, 2 teams
| 121 || 114 || 31.6 || .444 || .305 || .756 || 5.1 || 3.4 || 2.3 || 0.1 || 3.1 || 19.1

Personal life 
McDonald is the daughter of Aaron and Andrea McDonald. Her brother Tre'von Willis played basketball at UNLV.

McDonald is currently engaged to former Arizona defensive back Devon Brewer, who proposed to her after the Wildcats were eliminated from the Pac-12 Tournament in 2020.

References

External links 
 Aari McDonald on Twitter
 Aari McDonald on Instagram
 Arizona Wildcats bio

1998 births
Living people
All-American college women's basketball players
American women's basketball players
Arizona Wildcats women's basketball players
Atlanta Dream draft picks
Atlanta Dream players
Basketball players from California
Point guards
Shooting guards
Sportspeople from Fresno, California
Washington Huskies women's basketball players
21st-century American women